Ta Lam is a khum (commune) of Mongkol Borei District in Banteay Meanchey Province in western Cambodia.

Villages

 Preah Srae
 Ta Lam Kandal
 Ta Lam Chong
 Boeng Khleang Lech
 Chong Kouk
 Boeng Khleang Kaeut
 Khla Kham Chhkae
 Boeng Veaeng

References

Communes of Banteay Meanchey province
Mongkol Borey District